James Titus Godbolt (October 2, 1927 – May 16, 2008), known professionally as Jimmy Slyde and also as the "King of Slides", was an American tap dancer known for his innovative tap style mixed with jazz.

Slyde was a popular rhythm tap dancer in America in the mid-20th century, when he performed on the nightclub and burlesque circuits. He was also popular in Europe and lived in Paris for a brief period of his life. Slyde appeared in several musicals and shows in the 1980s, and he received numerous awards for his talent. He was known for his signature move, the slide.

Early life
Godbolt was born in Atlanta and moved to Boston at the age of three. As a child, his mother encouraged him to play the violin, and he enrolled at the Boston Conservatory of Music to advance as a violinist. However, the Conservatory was across the street from Stanley Brown's dance studio, which he would visit to watch great tap dancers such as Bill "Bojangles" Robinson, John W. Bubbles, Charles "Honi" Coles, and Derby Wilson. At the age of twelve, Godbolt quit violin lessons at the Conservatory and began tap lessons at Brown's studio with his mother's blessing (she wanted him to do something other than play sports to help contain his energy). At the studio, he studied under Brown himself and a student teacher, Eddie "Schoolboy" Ford, who taught Godbolt the slide. Godbolt connected with another dancer known for slides, Jimmy "Sir Slyde" Mitchell, and they put together an act to take on the road.

Career
In the 1940s, Mitchell and Godbolt started performing at local clubs and on the burlesque circuit calling themselves the Slyde Brothers. This in turn caused Godbolt to be renamed forevermore, Jimmy "Slyde". Their acts included action tricks similar to those the Nicholas Brothers performed; however, they used slides as their trademark move. One dance critic, Sally Sommer, explained his slides as such, "He's upstage left and sliding downstage right as fast and smooth as a skier, arms held out to the side, head tilted. He stops the cascade by banking backward, slips into a fast flurry of taps, working quick and low to the floor and ends the phrase by pulling up high and flashing off a triple turn." The act was such a hit, they received invitations to go on the road to perform with big band names of the time, including Count Basie, Duke Ellington, Louis Armstrong, and Barry Harris. Their tapping was part of the bands' songs where they would create the music for many measures and then the band would come back in, and they would trade off back and forth like that the entire act.

Slyde performed during the 1950s, at a time when rock and roll was emerging and diverting American interest away from big band music with tap acts. He attempted to find work in other cities including San Francisco, Chicago, and Hollywood on the burlesque and nightclub circuits as well as in movies, but work had dried up in America. He found a temporary job working as a choreographer for the tap dancers the Crosby Brothers in the 1960s, but in 1966 Slyde was invited to perform at the Berlin Jazz Festival in Europe. He attended with Baby Laurence, James Buster Brown, and Chuck Green, and the crowd received them with positive praise including regarding them as "Harlem's All-Star Dancers". He moved to Paris in the 1970s, where he worked intensively with Sarah Petronio. Petronio nurtured the expatriated Slyde out from self-imposed retirement in France, back into a productive and creative fulfillment and became his dancing partner in Tap and Jazz concerts "It's About Time", accompanied by some of the Europe's finest jazz musicians.

After living, teaching, and performing in Paris, he appeared in the production Black and Blue (1985), which was later reset in New York on Broadway in 1989, in which he also performed. As part of the Broadway cast, he was nominated for a Tony Award for this performance, and appeared on the original cast recording album, soloing on the song "Stompin' at the Savoy". He was part of the 1980s tap revival, which led him to stay in the United States and thrive much like during his early career. Throughout his revival and the resurgence of tap in America, Slyde performed in the films The Cotton Club (1984), Round Midnight (1986), and Tap (1989), with Gregory Hines and Sammy Davis Jr. He also appeared on several television shows and in the 1985 television special Motown Returns to the Apollo, which won the 1985 Emmy Award for Outstanding Variety, Music or Comedy Program. In 1992, Slyde was a featured artist in "The Majesty of Tap" dance concert at the Lincoln Center in New York.

In the 1990s, Slyde started holding jam sessions every week at a jazz nightclub in New York called La Cave. This became an education-based practice where up-and-coming tappers would come and improvise, while older and experienced tappers would mentor them. Among the mentored included dancers such as Savion Glover, Van Porter, Ira Bernstein, and Roxane Butterfly.

Legacy and death
Slyde was known for being a great rhythm tapper who had impeccable musicality (partly due to his early music training), perfect timing, and slides that made it appear is if he could glide across the floor effortlessly. His slides were essential to his musicality. "The slides took on many parts of speech, from little connective scoots to long, stage-traversing slalom runs. Slides allowed him to tease the beat, delaying then catching up. They were silences, visually exciting rests, but they also functioned as long notes, as Slyde's physical dynamics, speeding and slowing, suggested crescendos and diminuendos." He was usually the last dancer to perform because he would top any dancer who rivaled him. However, Slyde was a humble man happy to be part of the tap community, who brought a sound-oriented emphasis to tap and called it "a translating thing". The younger generation gained knowledge from him and regarded him as one of the greats including Savion Glover who stated he was "the Godfather of tap" and "one of the true masters of the art form".

Slyde died on May 16, 2008 at the age of 80 in his home in Hanson, Massachusetts.

Filmography

Awards and honors
 1984–1986: Choreographer's Fellowship, National Endowment for the Arts

 1988: Choreographer's Fellowship, National Endowment for the Arts

 1993: Choreographer's Fellowship, National Endowment for the Arts

 1998: Living Treasure in American Dance award, Oklahoma City University, Ann Lacy School of American Dance

 1999: National Heritage Fellowship, National Endowment for the Arts

 2001: Recipient of the first Charles "Honi" Coles Award

 2001: along with mentee Rocky Mendes, awarded a Traditional Arts Apprenticeship by the Mass Cultural Council

 2002: Honorary Doctorate of Performing Arts in American Dance, Oklahoma City University, School of American Dance and Entertainment

 2002: Hoofer Award, American Tap Dance Foundation

 2003: Fellowship for Creative Arts in Choreography, John Simon Guggenheim Memorial Foundation

 2005: Dance Magazine award

 2007: Slyde and Mendes, Traditional Arts Apprenticeship, Mass Cultural Council

 2008: Inducted into the International Tap Dance Hall of Fame

See also
 List of dancers

References

External links

Jimmy Slyde performing at The White House 
A review of Black and Blue
Archival footage of Gregory Hines, Dianne Walker and Jimmy Slyde in 1996 at Jacob's Pillow

1927 births
2008 deaths
20th-century African-American people
20th-century American male actors
African-American male actors
African-American male dancers
American male dancers
American male film actors
American male musical theatre actors
American male stage actors
American male television actors
American tap dancers
Dancers from Georgia (U.S. state)
Dancers from Massachusetts
Male actors from Atlanta
Male actors from Boston
Musicians from Atlanta
Musicians from Boston
National Heritage Fellowship winners